Hyoso (687–702) (r. 692–702) was the thirty-second monarch of Silla, a kingdom that flourished on the Korean peninsula from approximately 200 to 927 CE. He was the eldest son of King Sinmun and his second consort Queen Sinmok. He reigned for a decade and died of illness in the Silla capital in the autumn of 702.

Hyoso's reign was characterized by a continuing trend towards centralization following Silla's unification of the peninsula. Like his father, Hyoso faced some opposition in the form of revolts by high-ranking members of the Silla aristocracy. In the summer of 700, for instance, the ichan (a high rank in Silla's strict bone rank system) Gyeong-yeong 慶永 was implicated in treasonous plots and executed. These machinations also apparently involved Silla's Chief Minister of State, who was removed from office.

Relations with Tang also saw improvement during Hyoso's reign following the diplomatic disintegration that followed in the wake of the wars of unification during the 660s and 670s and the foundering of the Tang-Silla alliance. Tribute relations were steadily maintained and Hyoso, as Sinmun before him, was "enfeoffed" by the Tang emperor as King of Silla.

A few citations in the record of King Hyoso in the 12th century Korean history Samguk Sagi also attest to steady diplomatic contact with Japan, and Japanese histories (notably the Shoku Nihongi) are reliable sources for confirming death dates of Silla's kings and queens during this period, as Japan would often hear of their deaths through diplomatic envoys.

King Hyoso died in 702. Because he had no son he was succeeded by his younger full brother who reigned as King Seongdeok.

Family 

 Grandfather: Munmu of Silla (626–681; reigned 661–681
 Grandmother: Queen Jaeui, of the Kim Clan (자의왕후 김씨;d.681)
 Father Sinmun of Silla (r. 681–692) (김정명)
 Mother: Queen Sinmok of the Kim clan (신목왕후 김씨;d. 700)

See also
 History of Korea
 List of Koreans
 Three Kingdoms of Korea
 Unified Silla

References

Silla rulers
Silla Buddhists
Korean Buddhist monarchs
687 births
702 deaths
Year of birth unknown
7th-century Korean monarchs
8th-century Korean monarchs